Syed Abul Hossain (born 1 August 1951) is a Bangladeshi politician and businessman. He is a member of the Bangladesh Awami League and served as a member of the Parliament of Bangladesh since 1991. He was the Communication Minister of Bangladesh, and State Minister of Local Government, Rural Development and Co-operatives.

Early life 
Hossain was born on 1 October 1951 in Dashar village, Madaripur. His father was Syed Atahar Ali and his mother was Syeda Sufia Ali. He completed his bachelor's degree in business management from the University of Dhaka in 1972 and master's in 1974. Hossain married Khwaja Nargis Hossain in September 1979. He has two daughters: Syeda Rubaiyat Hossain and Syeda Iffat Hossain.

Business career 
After completing his Education from the University of Dhaka, Hossain joined Government Service and later ventured into business. He founded SAHCO International Ltd and SAHCO NGO in 1975. He was the founding Member of Boao Forum for Asia, which was conceived in 2001 in Hainan Province, China.

Political career 
Hossain has been elected as a member of the Bangladesh Parliament in four successive general elections: in 1991, 1996, 2001 and 2008. He performed as a communication minister, and the State Minister for Local Government, Rural Development and Cooperatives of the previous Government. He was the International Affairs Secretary of Bangladesh Awami League.

Padma Bridge scandal
In 2012 World Bank alleged that Hossain was a conspirator in the Padma Bridge Graft Scandal. Hossain denied the allegations that he misused his position as Communications Minister of Bangladesh. He resigned from his office on 23 July 2012. He was acquitted in 2014 by the Bangladeshi courts and the Anti-Corruption Commission.

The Canadian case was dropped in 2017 after Judge Ian Nordheimer found that the Royal Canadian Mounted Police did not have sufficient evidence to justify their initial wiretap, although Hossain had already been acquitted by a lower Canadian court. Government spokesperson Sajeeb Wazed called for those who raised the allegations to apologise. The construction of the Padma Bridge is now complete.

References

External links 
 

1951 births
Living people
Awami League politicians
8th Jatiya Sangsad members
State Ministers of Local Government, Rural Development and Co-operatives
5th Jatiya Sangsad members
7th Jatiya Sangsad members
9th Jatiya Sangsad members
People from Madaripur District
University of Dhaka alumni
Bangladeshi people of Arab descent